Sailor's Song may refer to:

Sea song (disambiguation)
Sailor's Song, a 1943 novel by James Hanley
Sailor's Song, a 2004 play John Patrick Shanley
 Sailor's Song (film), a 1932 French film
 The Sailor's Song, a 1958 East German film
"A Sailor's Song", a 1995 song by Richard Faith
"The Sailor's Song", a song by Bobby Hutcherson from the 1979 album Un Poco Loco